McDowell's blind snake (Gerrhopilus mcdowelli ) is a species of snake in the family Gerrhopilidae.

Etymology
The specific name, mcdowelli, is in honor of American herpetologist Samuel Booker McDowell (born 1928).

Geographic range
G. mcdowelli is endemic to Papua New Guinea.

Reproduction
G. mcdowelli is oviparous.

References

Further reading
Vidal, Nicolas; Marin, Julie; Morini, Marina; Donnellan, Steve; Branch, William R.; Thomas, Richard; Vences, Miguel; Wynn, Addison; Cruaud, Corinne; Hedges, S. Blair (2010). "Blindsnake evolutionary tree reveals long history on Gondwana". Biology Letters 6: 558–561. (Gerrhopilus mcdowelli, new combination).
Wallach V (1996). "Two New Blind Snakes of the Typhlops ater Group from Papua New Guinea". Russian J. Herp. 3 (2): 107–118. (Typhlops mcdowelli, new species).

Gerrhopilus
Reptiles described in 1996